Zansoni is a village and seat (chef-lieu) of the commune of Fakolo in the Cercle of Koutiala in the Sikasso Region of southern Mali.  The village is 35 km northwest of Koutiala.

References

Populated places in Sikasso Region